Carter O'Donnell (born December 23, 1998) is a Canadian gridiron football offensive tackle for the Indianapolis Colts of the National Football League (NFL). He played U Sports football for the Alberta Golden Bears from 2016 to 2019. He was one of two U Sports football players to be invited to the 2020 East–West Shrine Bowl, which is held in the United States.

Professional career
O'Donnell was ranked as the third best player in the CFL's Amateur Scouting Bureau final rankings for players eligible in the 2020 CFL Draft, and first by players in U Sports, at the end of the 2019 U Sports season. He was drafted in the third round, 22nd overall, by the Montreal Alouettes.

Indianapolis Colts
O'Donnell was not selected in the 2020 NFL Draft, but officially signed as an undrafted free agent with the Indianapolis Colts on April 29, 2020. He was waived on September 5, 2020 and signed to the practice squad the next day. On January 10, 2021, O'Donnell signed a reserve/futures contract with the Colts.

On August 31, 2021, O'Donnell was waived by the Colts and re-signed to the practice squad the next day. 

He signed a reserve/future contract on January 10, 2022. On August 2, 2022, O’Donnell was placed on injured reserve.

On March 15, 2023, O'Donnell signed a contract extension with the Colts.

References

External links
Golden Bears profile
Indianapolis Colts profile

1998 births
Living people
Alberta Golden Bears football players
Indianapolis Colts players
Players of Canadian football from Alberta
Sportspeople from Calgary
American football offensive linemen
Canadian players of American football